Shan King (North) is an at-grade MTR  stop located at Shan King Estate Car Park, Shan King Estate in Tuen Mun District, Hong Kong. It began service on 24 September 1988 and belongs to Zone 2. It serves the north of Shan King Estate.

There is only one platform in Shan King North stop for Line 505.

References 

MTR Light Rail stops
Former Kowloon–Canton Railway stations
Tuen Mun District
Railway stations in Hong Kong opened in 1988
MTR Light Rail stops named from housing estates